Albert Pearce is an American politician who served in the Vermont House of Representatives from 2009 to 2019.

References

Living people
Middle Tennessee State University alumni
21st-century American politicians
Members of the Vermont House of Representatives
Year of birth missing (living people)